Task Force Games was a game company started in 1979 by Allen Eldridge and Stephen V. Cole. TFG published many games, most notably including both Star Fleet Battles (currently published by the original designers, Amarillo Design Bureau) and the Starfire series of games (which is now published by Starfire Design Studio), which were later novelized by David Weber into such books as In Death Ground, The Shiva Option and Insurrection. Eldridge sold the company to New World Computing in 1988, which became a division of The 3DO Company in 1996 and went out of business in 2003.

During the period that TFG was owned by New World Computing, the two companies attempted the first-ever simultaneous release of a board game and computer game.  The two versions of King's Bounty wound up releasing about 9 months apart, and after NWC had sold TFG to John Olsen.  Future versions of New World Computing's version of King's Bounty were called Heroes of Might & Magic to avoid confusion between the two very different games that had been designed by different designers. TFG never wound up releasing a second version of the King's Bounty board game.

TFG also published historical games such as Battlewagon and History of the Second World War.

Task Force Games also published a series of Pocket Games, their version of microgames.  Several of these microgames were later expanded and released as board games.  TFG microgames include:

Asteroid Zero-Four
Battlewagon
Boarding Party
Cerberus
Checkpoint Omega
City States of Arklyrell
Escape from Altassar
Intruder
Moon Base Clavius
Operation Pegasus
Prochorovka: Armor at Kursk (later released as the board game Armor at Kursk)
Robots!
Spellbinder
Star Fleet Battles and later Expansion #1, Expansion #2, Expansion #3
Starfire
Starfire II
Starfire III: Empires
Survival / The Barbarian
The Warriors of Batak
Ultra-Warrior
Valkenburg Castle

Many of the games were considered cutting edge for their time. One distinct feature that many of them had was that unlike many wargames of that era, players often had a degree of customization over their armies—For instance, in the Starfire series, a player could design every component of his starships, and in Robots!, a player could build his individual robots from a modular design, making trade-offs in price and functionality between different movement and weapons systems.

Most of Task Force Games products were designed by Stephen V Cole, who was the "cutting edge" designer of his time.  All games are fundamentally based on "artificial time" of some kind.  The "first generation" of game and simulation design is simple "I go, you go" turns that classic and family games like Checkers, Chess, Monopoly, and Risk have.  The "second generation" of game and simulation design was created by Charles S Roberts, founder of Avalon Hill and known as the "Founding Father of Board Games".  His version of "artificial time" is called a "phased-turn" and allows for "simultaneous play" of both players.  The "third-generation" of game and simulation design is Stephen V Cole's version of "artificial time", his "Impulse Chart" of Star Fleet Battles which expands upon the work of Charles S Roberts and exists within Robert's "phased-turns".  Somebody had asked for a "citation" about the games of Task Force Games being "cutting edge" for their day, this is it.

Task Force Games became the parent of AutoVentures and began releasing their products, beginning with The Road in 1985.

References

External links

Starfleet Battles

Board game publishing companies
Wargame companies